Axon terminals (also called synaptic boutons, terminal boutons, or end-feet) are distal terminations of the telodendria (branches) of an axon. An axon, also called a nerve fiber, is a long, slender projection of a nerve cell, or neuron, that conducts electrical impulses called action potentials away from the neuron's cell body, or soma, in order to transmit those impulses to other neurons, muscle cells or glands.

Neurons are interconnected in complex arrangements, and use electrochemical signals and neurotransmitter chemicals to transmit impulses from one neuron to the next; axon terminals are separated from neighboring neurons by a small gap called a synapse, across which impulses are sent. The axon terminal, and the neuron from which it comes, is sometimes referred to as the "presynaptic" neuron.

Nerve impulse release
Neurotransmitters are packaged into synaptic vesicles that cluster beneath the axon terminal membrane on the presynaptic side of a synapse. The axonal terminals are specialized to release the neurotransmitters of the presynaptic cell. The terminals release transmitter substances into a gap called the synaptic cleft between the terminals and the dendrites of the next neuron. The information is received by the dendrite receptors of the postsynaptic cell that are connected to it. Neurons don't touch each other, but communicate across the synapse.

The neurotransmitter molecule packages (vesicles) are created within the neuron, then travel down the axon to the distal axon terminal where they sit docked. Calcium ions then trigger a biochemical cascade which results in vesicles fusing with the presynaptic membrane and releasing their contents to the synaptic cleft within 180 µs of calcium entry. Triggered by the binding of the calcium ions, the synaptic vesicle proteins begin to move apart, resulting in the creation of a fusion pore. The presence of the pore allows for the release of neurotransmitter into the synaptic cleft. The process occurring at the axon terminal is exocytosis, which a cell uses to exude secretory vesicles out of the cell membrane. These membrane-bound vesicles contain soluble proteins to be secreted to the extracellular environment, as well as membrane proteins and lipids that are sent to become components of the cell membrane. Exocytosis in neuronal chemical synapses is Ca2+ triggered and serves interneuronal signalling.

Mapping activity

Wade Regehr, a Professor of Neurobiology at Harvard Medical School's Department of Neurobiology, developed a method to physiologically see the synaptic activity that occurs in the brain. A dye alters the fluorescence properties when attached to calcium. Using fluorescence-microscopy techniques calcium levels are detected, and therefore the influx of calcium in the presynaptic neuron. Regehr's laboratory specializes in pre-synaptic calcium dynamics which occurs at the axon terminals. Regehr studies the implication of calcium Ca2+ as it affects synaptic strength. By studying the physiological process and mechanisms, a further understanding is made of neurological disorders such as epilepsy, schizophrenia and major depressive disorder, as well as memory and learning.

See also 
Endoplasmic reticulum
Golgi apparatus
Micelle
Membrane nanotube
Endocytosis
Vesicular monoamine transporter

Further reading 

 
 
 
 
LTP promotes formation of multiple spine synapses between a single axon terminal and a dendrite.

References 

Neurohistology